S. Manasvi is an architect from Madhav Institute of Technology and Science (MITS), Gwalior who later, became a filmmaker and a writer. He is an alumnus of the Film and Television Institute of India, Pune. After passing out of FTII in 2004, he made corporate films, adfilms, music videos and wrote for Television. He has been credited the dialogue writer for Left Right Left, Choti Bahu and several other shows. He also wrote the dialogue for Parvarrish – Kuchh Khattee Kuchh Meethi, Ek Boond Ishq and Hum Hain Na. Currently, he is writing the dialogue for Ek Veer Ki Ardaas...Veera and Dilli Wali Thakur Gurls,  and developing shows.

He made his debut as a film director with Rajshri Productions' Love U...Mr. Kalakaar! featuring Tusshar Kapoor, Amrita Rao, Ram Kapoor, Madhoo, Kiran Kumar, Jai Kalra and in a very special appearance, Prem Chopra. The film introduces Prashant Ranyal in a cameo. This film was released on 13 May 2011 and got mixed response from critics and audience alike.

References

External links
 Glamsham.com
 Chhavi Creations
 
 Bollywood Hungama
 Tellychakkar

Film directors from Maharashtra
Living people
Place of birth missing (living people)
Year of birth missing (living people)
Film and Television Institute of India alumni